Keith Mitchell is a Grenadian politician.

Keith Mitchell may also refer to: 

 Keith Mitchell (American football) (born 1974), former American football linebacker
 Keith Mitchell (baseball) (born 1969), former baseball player
 Keith Mitchell (golfer) (born 1992), American golfer
 Keith Paul Mitchell, search and rescue technician

See also
 Keith Coogan (Keith Eric Mitchell, born 1970), American actor
 Keith Michell (1926–2015), Australian actor